Ranjha Ranjha Kardi (She keeps on saying Beloved) is a 2018 Pakistani drama serial that aired on Hum TV. It is directed by Kashif Nisar and written by Faiza Iftikhar, starring Iqra Aziz, Imran Ashraf and Syed Jibran. It emerged as one of the most iconic dramas in Pakistan television history. The serial is produced by Momina Duraid under their banner MD Productions in collaboration with SBCH Productions.

Plot 

The story revolves around a beautiful and idealist girl, Noori.  Noori belongs to a poor family. Her parents live by picking garbage from streets, therefore she is uncomfortable with the environment around her. She rejects her parents' lifestyle and wishes for a better and respectable life. To fulfill this wish of hers, she moves to a city and starts a respectable living by working in a factory. In this journey, she learns of Sahir and Bhola. Sahir is a greedy young man, who works in a shop and wishes for a better future; whereas, mentally weak and childlike Bhola owns a mansion and agricultural land in a village, (which his paternal uncle, Nusrat Chacha, takes care of). Bhola is loved deeply by his mother, Fehmida. Sahir and Bhola both get attached to Noor Bano's life, one which is by total deceit and the other is an ordeal.

Sahir is not serious about Noori, but Noori is always daydreaming about her marriage with Sahir. Noori somehow convinces him to marry her, to which he nonchalantly agrees. One day, when Noori comes to visit Sahir, she sees that there is some investigation going on and becomes worried when Sahir is found guilty of stealing money from the shop he works in. The police demands ransom for Sahir's release and Noori is thinking of the ways she could get the money. When Noori asks her baji for money, she refuses and her husband also sexually harasses Noori by offering her money to be with him. Noori confronts the factory owner and says she doesn't want his money and quits working at the factory.

She steals her Baji's jewelry to pay for Sahir's release. Afterwards, Sahir gets released, whereas Noori is jailed for stealing the jewellery. Noori's father makes a deal with Shokha, an aged smuggler, to free his daughter and marry her. On the other hand, Noori threatens her former boss to either take back the case or she will expose him. The Haji (former boss) does it and Noori is free. However, she still has to get rid of Shokha, so she runs away and goes to Sahir, who is arranging to leave the city. Sahir refuses to marry her, (as he was not sincere with his intentions), saying that she had spent a night in the lock-up and who knows if any lustful policeman had disgraced her. Noori, heartbroken, returns to her mentor, Amma Jannate's house. She asks Amma Jannate to help her because she doesn't want to marry Shokha and is considering suicide. Amma Jannate tells her the only way out is to wed, which will also fulfill her desire of living a respectable life.

The person Amma Jannate is talking about is actually Bhola, but Noori isn't aware of it until after her marriage. Has all this happened to her for good and a better future? Initially, Noori can't stand him, even feeling for Bhola. She then realizes that Sahir is a Cunning and Deceitful greedy man and she wouldn't want anyone else to have him as a life partner so in an attempt to break Komal and Sahir’s alliance and she exposes him to everyone and succeeds. It is revealed that 23 years ago Bhola’s mother made a wish at the Mazhar and she will sacrifice him and give him to a Peer. And it was her belief that if you arent having any children but as soon as you have your first child and you leave it at the Mazhar you will have many more, but her heart doesnt listen and she doesnt leave him at the Mazhar and then she never had any other children and Bhola became mentally ill and her husband died. She misunderstands the situation as the Peer being angry and that is the cause of the whole problem and says that if Bhola and Noori have any children she will leave the first one at the Mazhar but her daughter in law Noori explains to her that this can happen to anyone and we should not associate partners with Allah (God) and that if you have a child that is because of God and not a Peer at a Mazhar and that she is doing Shirk. Noori tries to get away from Bhola, but later she develops love, care, and empathy for him, due to his innocence and pure love for her. This intense story develops from there, and so does Noori and Bhola's unconventional romantic relationship. It ends with Bhola’s mental condition becoming mostly fine and then she has a baby boy who Bhola refuses to meet as he is afraid of him being like Bhola, but when Noori convinces him to see his baby, he kisses him on the forehead and starts to cry.

Cast 
 Iqra Aziz as Noor Bano "Noori"
 Imran Ashraf as Mohiuddin "Bhola"
 Asma Abbas as Fehmida; Bhola's mother 
 Syed Jibran as Sahir
 Ammara Butt as Komal; Bhola's cousin
 Kashif Mehmood as Nusrat Mian; Bhola's uncle
 Munazzah Arif as Rizwana; Bhola's aunt
 Zaib Rehman as Amma Jannate; Noori's mentor
 Ismat Iqbal as Noori's mother
 Faiz Chauhan as Nazeer; Noori's father
 Noor ul Hassan as Shokha
 Ahmed Abdul Rehman as Mumtaz Begum
 Umer Darr as Darr; Bhola's friend
 Zaryab Haider as Shafiq; Bhola's friend
 Haseeb Muhammad Bin Qasim as Haji Sahab; Noori's employer
 Aisha Khan as Qudsia Begum; Haji Sahab's wife
 Momina Aayla as Young Noori
 Shabana Bhatti as Shakoorun

International broadcast 

The series aired in India on Zindagi, started from December 2022.

Reception 
The show's first episode has over 10 million views on YouTube and the TRPs of the show several times were the highest for the timeslot. The drama and its story has gained critical acclaim for various things; Imran Ashraf's performance as Bhola, Iqra Aziz's performance as Noori, Asma Abbas's performance as Amma Jee, dealing with hidden social issues, such as awareness about mentally challenged people, wrong perceptions of society on castes and social status, misinterpretation of Islam and made up religious practices, and  messages on sensitive issues.

Soundtrack

Awards and nominations

References

External links 
Official website

2018 Pakistani television series debuts
2019 Pakistani television series endings
Pakistani drama television series
Television shows set in Lahore
Hum TV
Hum Network Limited
Hum TV original programming
Pakistani romantic drama television series
Television series by MD Productions
MD Productions
Television series created by Momina Duraid
Urdu-language telenovelas
Television series set in Punjab, Pakistan
Television series about dysfunctional families
Pakistani telenovelas